Canal 5 (English: Channel 5) is an uruguayan national television network owned by the Ministry of Education and Culture. The channel began broadcasting on June 19, 1963.

References

External links 
  

Television networks in Uruguay
Television stations in Uruguay
Mass media in Montevideo
1963 establishments in Uruguay
Television channels and stations established in 1963
Spanish-language television stations
State media
Government-owned companies of Uruguay